Reagan Youth is an American anarcho-punk band formed by singer Dave Rubinstein (Dave Insurgent) and guitarist Paul Bakija (Paul Cripple) in Queens, New York City in early 1980.

History

Initial career (1980–1990) 
Rubinstein and Bakija attended Forest Hills High School, the same as that of the Ramones, when they formed their band.  After rehearsals under the name Pus with a varying rhythm section, the group changed its name to Reagan Youth shortly before playing its first gig on August 22, 1980, with bassist Andy Bryan (Andy Apathy) and drummer Charlie Bonet (Charlie Tripper). Reagan Youth quickly gained a following and were soon playing the punk clubs of Manhattan. Bakija's physics teacher shaved his head at CBGB's one night and after that became associated with the band, hauling equipment in his Dodge Dart. After the band recorded a four-song demo in 1981, Bryan was replaced by Al Pike. Bonet departed soon after; after the band briefly rehearsed with Rubinstein filling in on drums, Steve Weissman joined full-time. They signed to the R Radical imprint.

After graduation and the release of their first record, the seven-song Youth Anthems for the New Order EP, they began touring nationally and were regulars at the Sunday afternoon hardcore matinee shows at CBGB. In 1984, prior to a significant US tour, Pike and Weissman left the group, with Pike going on to join a formative version of Glenn Danzig's group Samhain briefly around this time. They were replaced by Victor Dominicis (Vic Venom) and Rick Griffith (Rick Royale) respectively. Griffith was later replaced in 1985 by Javier Madriaga (Johnny Aztec), who has also played drums in Lujuria, A.P.P.L.E., and Heart Attack.

By the late 1980s the extensive touring had taken its toll on the group. Despite the many shows played and the relatively large album sales for a hardcore punk band, they continually found themselves broke. When Ronald Reagan left office in 1989, the band split up. Despite their decision to disband, the group attracted the attention of the burgeoning punk label New Red Archives, with whom they signed a two-album deal. New Red Archives first re-released Youth Anthems for the New World Order with three additional outtakes as the Volume 1 LP. In 1990, Bakija (playing both guitar and bass), Madriaga, and Rubinstein recorded a final album, Volume 2.

Post-breakup (1990–2006) 
Dominicis went on to play guitar in Nausea while Bakija, Madriaga, and Rubinstein continued making music together, briefly performing in a psychedelic rock group called House of God that was derailed by Rubinstein's increasing drug and health problems. House of God recorded a 7-song demo, an unmixed version of which can be found online.

By 1990 Rubinstein had become a heroin user and occasional dealer. In a conflict with another dealer, he was severely beaten with a baseball bat, requiring weeks of hospitalization. In 1993 he began dating Tiffany Bresciani, who supported both of their drug habits by prostitution. This same year, Rubinstein's mother was killed in a car accident. Soon after, he and Bresciani were on Houston Street looking for customers and drugs. A familiar customer in a truck hired Bresciani and the two of them disappeared. A few days later, police on Long Island stopped the same truck and discovered Bresciani's slain body in the back. The driver was Joel Rifkin, later convicted as a serial killer responsible for the murder of several sex workers. Despondent over his continuing drug addiction and the loss of his girlfriend and mother, Rubinstein committed suicide shortly thereafter.

This same year, New Red Archives issued A Collection of Pop Classics, which collected both Volume 1 and Volume 2 on a single CD.

In 1998, New Red Archives released Live & Rare, a CD compiling highlights from New York City-area Reagan Youth sets from the early '80s with the Pike/Weissman lineup, along with tracks from the band's initial demo and a brief demo for Volume 2. Pike and New Red Archives owner Nicky Garratt, also the guitarist for the British band the UK Subs, contributed liner notes for this release.

In 2002, plans for a reunion set at CBGB featuring Bakija, Bryan and Bonet were shattered by Bryan's sudden, fatal heart attack.  In the years following, Bakija played a few live sets of Reagan Youth material with other musicians.

Reformation (2006–present) 

In 2006, Reagan Youth officially reformed around Bakija, Pike, Madriaga, and new vocalist Pat McGowen (Pat SpEd). They initially intended only to play a single show but opted to continue after the project "took on a life of its own."  They played several additional local and regional tours, and embarked on the "Resurrection Tour" in August 2007 with Boston hardcore band Mouth Sewn Shut.

The band began expressing interest in writing and recording a third record, and suggested that it would be about the life and times of Dave Insurgent. The band continued to tour extensively, including their first shows in Germany and Belgium in 2008 and a European tour in 2009.

In early 2010 McGowen left and after a year of inactivity, the band resumed performed live in late 2010 with new singer Kenny Young, with drummer Mike Sabatino replacing Madriaga.  Bassist Dave Manzullo replaced Pike shortly thereafter due to Pike's health concerns.  They released the new recording "Lucky 7" through free Internet outlets in 2011. But Young's drug addiction led to his replacement by Jim "Diesel" Pepe for the 2011 West Coast tour and two short New England tours in 2012. Pepe saved the band from further dysfunction by learning a full slate of material in days, stepping down in late 2012 to pursue other projects. Paul Rye stepped in for the band's 'Drivin' South Tour' in October 2012. A permanent lead singer was found during that tour, the band's drum technician Trey Oswald. The final piece to the band's puzzle was drummer Stig Whisper replacing Sabatino, allowing Reagan Youth to have a final, definitive lineup for the reformation years. In 2013, Reagan Youth toured with Trey Oswald on vocals, Tibbie X on bass, Stig Whisper on drums, and Paul Cripple, who continues working on one last album about the life and times of Dave Insurgent as the band continues to play at venues everywhere. In March 2015, Reagan Youth announced a west coast mini-tour with Rick Contreras (ex-Dr. Know) on drums and Jeff Penalty (ex-Dead Kennedys) on vocals. Jeff Penalty was then replaced for the same tour by A.J. Delinquent (DeFeo) guitarist in Philadelphia Punk Band GASH, for whom Tibbie X is the lead vocalist.

Stza (2022) 
Paul has hired Scott Sturgeon a.k.a. STZA Crack as a frontman.

Music

Lyrical content 
Reagan Youth is an aggressively anarchist, socialist, and anti-racist band, and often utilized Ku Klux Klan and Nazi Party imagery for satirical effect. In their original 1980s incarnation, they sought to address the parallels between the policies of Ronald Reagan, the Christian Right and American conservatism, and the beliefs of the hate groups. Their self-titled song, "Reagan Youth", uses a tongue-in-cheek rhetoric to draw parallels between Young Republicans who rallied to the cause of Ronald Reagan, and the Hitler Youth of Nazi Germany, ushering in an era of songs about Ronald Reagan in American punk music. The band expressed its left-wing politics through irony, using images from hate groups for their album/CD covers.

Musical style 
Musically, the band was firmly rooted in the early hardcore/punk crossover tradition, but moved deeper into waters uncharted by their punk rock contemporaries as their career progressed. While their 1983 debut is an accomplished work squarely in keeping with hardcore punk convention, their 1990 followup features dense guitar work replete with solos and overdubs, diversified tempos and several sonic experiments, leading it to draw comparisons to Black Sabbath and 1970s album-oriented rock.

Band members 

Current members
Stza (Scott Sturgeon) - guitar and lead vocals
Paul (Cripple) Bakija – guitars (1980–1990, 2006–present)
Tibbie X – bass (2012–present)
Charlie (Tripper) Bonet – drums (1980–1982, 2019–present)
Mark Zapata – drums (2022- )

Former members

Dave Rubinstein – vocals (1980–1990; died 1993)
Andy Bryan – bass (1980–1981; died 2002)
Al Pike – bass (1981–1984, 2006–2011)
Steve Weissman – drums (1982–1984)
Victor Dominicis – bass (1984–1990)
Rick Griffith – drums (1984–1985)
Javier Madriaga – drums (1985–1990, 2006–2010)
Pat McGowan – vocals (2006–2010)
Kenny Young – guitars, vocals (2010–2012; died 2014)
Jim "Diesel" Pepe – vocals (2011–2012)
Dave Manzullo – bass (2011–2012)
Mike Sabatino – drums (2010–2012)
Felipe Torres – drums (2012–2013)
Trey Oswald – vocals (2012–2015)
Stig Whisper – drums (2013–2015)
Jeff Penalty – vocals (2015)
A.J. Delinquent – vocals (2016)
Rick Contreras – drums (2015–2016)
Max M. - vocals (2016)
Björn - drums (2016) 
Kevin Knuckles – drums (2016–2017)
David Luna – vocals (2016-2017)
Spike Polite – vocals (2017–2018)
Vince Sollecito – drummer (2017–2019) 
Neil Patterson – vocals (2019–2021)

Timeline

Discography 
Reagan Youth released only one album during their existence as a band (in 1984); originally titled Youth Anthems for the New Order, it was re-released as Reagan Youth (Volume 1) by the small independent label New Red Archives in 1989. This album eventually sold 40,000 copies. A second album, titled Volume 2, was completed and released in 1990, after the official breakup of the band. Both are still available on vinyl, as well as a CD titled A Collection of Pop Classics that combines both records. A collection of live recordings was issued in 1998 as Live and Rare.

CDs and vinyl 
Youth Anthems for the New Order (1984)
Volume 1 (1989)
Volume 2 (1990)
A Collection of Pop Classics (1994)
Live & Rare (1998)
Punk Rock New York (2007)
The Complete Youth Anthems for the New Order 7" box set (2016)

Bootlegs 
 Live at CBGBs August 7, 1982
 Live at CBGBs November 20, 1982 (Ratcage Records Benefit)
 Live at CBGBs Vol. One 7"

Appearances 
 Hardcore Breakout USA (1990)
 Hardcore Breakout USA Volume 2 (1995)
 The Punk, The Bad & The Ugly (1997)
 At War With Society (1998)
 At War With Society II (1999)
 Mighty Attack (1999)
 Justified, pilot episode – song "USA" (2010)

See also 
 Ronald Reagan in music

References

Further reading

External links 

Official website

ReverbNation
Blogspot
Reagan Youth page at New Red Archives site
Reagan Youth at CDBaby

Anarcho-punk groups
Musical groups established in 1980
Musical groups disestablished in 1989
Hardcore punk groups from New York (state)
Musical groups from Queens, New York
Cultural depictions of Ronald Reagan